Daniel Barritt (born 23 August 1980) is a British World Rally Championship co-driver from England.

Background
Barritt was born in Burnley, UK. His family has been involved in rallying for three generations. His grandfather, for example, was a navigator (in the 1950s) and his dad adopted the same activity two decades later, at which point Barritt started going along with his dad. This piqued his interest from a very young age.  He thinks he saw his very first rally from his bassinet.

Early co-driving
Barritt believes that his hometown, Burnley, played a part in his sporting career, given the number of famous stock car and bike racers who hail from the area. The town also has motorsport clubs which help those interested get into the sport and for sure assisted Barritt when he first started out.

Going pro
When Barritt was 16, he co-drove for his dad in Scotland on the Tour of Mull Rally. From then on he was hooked.  In 2000 in England, he drove in his first rally.  He turned pro in 2002. From 2006, Barritt became a regular co-driver in the WRC (World Rally Championship), marking the start of his three-year partnership with Fumio Nutahara, a PWRC driver. 

In 2009, Barritt and Conrad Rautenbach competed in the World Rally Championship. In 2010 he switched back to PWRC with Toshi Arai. In 2011 and 2012 he navigated for Alastair Fisher, a WRC Academy front-runner.  He then joined Elfyn Evans at the time that Evans started making his mark in 2013, and also co-driving with him as part of the M-Sport World Rally Team in 2014.

Career highlights
One highlight occurred in 2002 when David Higgins approached him and asked if he would co-drive for him in the British and US championships.  At the US international rally three days later, he was part of the winning team.  Another highlight was the 2008 Tour of Mull rally that he won with his friend Paul Mackinnon.

WRC victories

Results

WRC results

* Season still in progress.

References

External links

 Daniel Barritt's e-wrc profile

1980 births
Living people
British rally co-drivers
English rally drivers
Sportspeople from Burnley
World Rally Championship co-drivers